Grimsby Augustinian Friary was a friary  in Lincolnshire, England.

References

Monasteries in Lincolnshire